Polyplectana is a genus of sea cucumbers in the family Synaptidae. The type species is Polyplectana kefersteinii.

Species
The World Register of Marine Species lists the following species :

Polyplectana galatheae  Heding, 1928
Polyplectana grisea  Heding, 1931
Polyplectana kallipeplos  (Sluiter, 1887)
Polyplectana kefersteinii  (Selenka, 1867)
Polyplectana longogranula  Heding, 1928
Polyplectana nigra  (Semper, 1867)
Polyplectana oculata  Heding, 1928
Polyplectana samoae  Heding, 1928
Polyplectana sluiteri  Heding, 1928
Polyplectana tahitiensis  Heding, 1928
Polyplectana unispicula  Heding, 1931
Polyplectana zamboangae  Heding, 1928

References

Holothuroidea genera
Synaptidae